Nachimuthu Mahalingam (April 9, 1923 – October 2, 2014) was an Indian educationist, industrialist, philanthropist and prominent person in Tamil Nadu. He was the Chairman of the Sakthi Group and Chairman of Ethiraj College for Women between 1972 and 1980.

Early life and education

Mahalingam was born in Somanthurai Chittoor, Pollachi, in the family of Nachimuthu Palani Gounder and Rukmani. Nachimuthu Gounder was a business man, who founded ABT - "The Anamallais Bus Transport Limited", a passenger transport company on 28.8.1931 at Pollachi, in Tamilnadu. The company had grown with 150 buses in 110 routes around Coimbatore region which laid the foundation for Sakthi group.

Mahalingam was married to his cousin, Mariyammal in the year 1945. The couple had 3 sons- Manickam, Balasubramaniam, Srinivaasan and 1 daughter - Karunambal Vanavarayar.

He had his school education at Pollachi. He obtained his B.Sc Degree in Physics at Loyola College, Chennai, in 1943. He joined the College of Engineering, Guindy, Chennai and received his Diploma in Mechanical Engineering in 1945.  Became an AMIE in 1951, MIE in 1975 and FIE in 1981 of the Institution of Engineers.

Politics 
Since his father Thiru P. Nachimuthu  was a municipal chairman, Mahalingam showed interest into politics at very early in life. He was elected  as the member of the Tamil Nadu Legislative Assembly in 1952 as an Indian National Congress candidate for the first time at the age of 29. Then he was elected as a member for the same constituency in the consecutive elections 1956 and 1962. During his tenure, he provided Parambikulam-Aliyar project and various schemes for the welfare of Pollachi Constituency.

He served as the Board of Directors for several public sector undertakings and the State Planning Commission in two terms.

Career
Mahalingam joined the Sakthi Group business in 1943 and helped grew the business and counts himself lucky to have started business during the planning era in post-Independence India. After the banks were nationalised by the then Prime Minister Indira Gandhi, this entrepreneur found it a big boon to start businesses and expand as more and more banks were ready to lend money easily. Today, the Sakthi Group is a name to reckon with as it has forayed into sugar, distilling, automobiles, finance, etc.

A well-known philanthropist who donate his wealth towards the development of culture, sports and education.

He is the founder of many educational institutions. Some of them are Kumaraguru College of Technology, Nachimuthu Polytechnic College, and Dr. Mahalingam College of Engineering and Technology and involved in the establishment of Institute of Asian Studies in Madras in the year 1981.

Honours and Titles

Spiritual life

Mahalingam had an important association with Sri Swami Satchidananda, the Indian swamiji who emigrated to the United States of America and founded the Integral Yoga Institutes. Mahalingham was a devoted follower of the Swamiji and contributed to the moral and financial causes of the Swamiji's works in the USA, especially to the Light Of Truth Universal Shrine (LOTUS) ecumenical temple in Virginia.

Mahalingam was also greatly associated with Vethathiri Maharishi and his teachings. He generously donated land for Temple of consciousness - Aliyar.

Mahalingam was an ardent follower of Ramalinga Swamigal alias Vallalar.

Death 
He died of a heart attack in 2014 while he speaking at a celebration in Chennai.

References

External links
 Short biography on Om Sakthi Publications

1923 births
Recipients of the Padma Bhushan in trade and industry
2014 deaths